Akira Narita (born April 9, 1945 in Karatsu, Saga) is a Japanese manga artist best known for writing about his experiences with the Japanese terekura (telephone club) industry.

See also
List of manga artists

References

Manga artists
Living people
1945 births
Artists from Saga Prefecture
20th-century Japanese male artists